is a brand of vinyl doll created by the Japanese company Volks in 1997. It is a highly poseable hybrid of fashion doll and action figure. Dollfie dolls generally come blank, i.e., their heads are not painted. When an artist paints a Dollfie, the technique is referred to as a "face-up" or "make-up". Dollfie dolls are much more flexible than typical Barbie-style western fashion dolls of the same size, because of the much larger number of joints in the body.

Dollfie are often confused with Super Dollfie, a larger 1/3 scale  range of resin dolls, also made by Volks, or even similar larger Asian ball-jointed dolls from other companies. The brand name Dollfie should accurately only be used for Volks's line of 1/6 dolls though.

Volks Inc. originally manufactured dolls with doll-crafters and artists in mind. For those with less skill, doll-crafting short-cuts were introduced, such as pre-rooted hair and stick-on eye decals. Later, finished dolls were issued. There are various body types, male and female, with several forms and skin tones for both as well as a line of child-sized dolls. The company also makes tools and materials to customize and maintain dolls.

Dollfie Dream is a line of 60 cm soft-bodied vinyl dolls made by Volks, similar to the smaller Dollfie dolls. This line consists of original Volks characters, but is mostly based on anime characters. Dollfie Dream has different types of dolls in their line-up, which are Dollfie Dream, Dollfie Dream Sister, Dollfie Dream Dynamite and Mini Dollfie Dream. Until recently there have only been female characters in the Dollfie Dream line-up, but in 
2016 Volks released their first two male Dollfie Dreams, namely the characters Len Kagamine from Vocaloid and Kirito from Sword Art Online.

See also 
 Asian fashion doll

External links 
 Volks Japan Dollfie section
 Volks USA Dollfie section
 Volks Japan Dollfie Dream Concept

Doll brands
Fashion dolls
Playscale figures